Tsunemi is both a masculine Japanese given name and a Japanese surname.

Possible writings
Tsunemi can be written using different combinations of kanji characters. Here are some examples:

常見, "usual, see"
常巳, "usual, sign of the snake (Chinese zodiac)"
常実, "usual, fruit/reality"
常實, "usual, fruit/reality"
常三, "usual, three"
常美, "usual, beauty"
常未, "usual, not yet"
恒巳, "always, sign of the snake (Chinese zodiac)"
恒実, "always, fruit/reality"
恒實, "always, fruit/reality"
恒三, "always, three"
恒美, "always, beauty"
恒未, "always, not yet"
庸巳, "common, sign of the snake (Chinese zodiac)"
庸実, "common, fruit/reality"
庸實, "common, fruit/reality"
庸三, "common, three"
毎巳, "every, sign of the snake (Chinese zodiac)"
毎実, "every, fruit/reality"
毎實, "every, fruit/reality"
毎三, "every, three"

The name can also be written in hiragana つねみ or katakana ツネミ.

Notable people with the given name Tsunemi
 (born 1951), Japanese zoologist.
 (1960–1993), Japanese baseball player.

Notable people with the surname Tsunemi
Yohei Tsunemi (常見 陽平, born 1974), Japanese labor sociologist.

See also
8543 Tsunemi, main-belt asteroid

Japanese masculine given names